Southorn is one of the 13 constituencies in the Wan Chai District.

The constituency returns one district councillor to the Wan Chai District Council, with an election every four years. The seat has been currently held by Independent Lee Pik-yee.

Southorn constituency is loosely based on Southorn Playground, Spring Garden Lane, Lee Tung Street and Hopewell Centre area of Wan Chai, covering the section of the Hennessy Road, Johnston Road, Queen's Road East, Kennedy Road, Bowen Road, and Magazine Gap Road in Wan Chai with estimated population of 14,665.

Councillors represented

Election results

2010s

2000s

1990s

References

Wan Chai
Mid-Levels
Wong Nai Chung Gap
Constituencies of Hong Kong
Constituencies of Wan Chai District Council
1994 establishments in Hong Kong
Constituencies established in 1994